John Eric Briscoe (born September 22, 1967) is an American former professional baseball pitcher.

Career
Briscoe attended Lloyd V. Berkner High School and Texas Christian University. In 1987, he played collegiate summer baseball with the Falmouth Commodores of the Cape Cod Baseball League.

Briscoe pitched for the Somerset Patriots of the independent Atlantic League of Professional Baseball from 1998 through 2002. In 2001, he compiled a 5–1 win-loss record with 22 saves and an earned-run average of 2.70 as the Patriots won the league championship.

References

External links

Retrosheet
The Baseball Gauge
Venezuela Winter League

1967 births
Living people
Akron Aeros players
Arizona League Athletics players
American expatriate baseball players in Canada
Baseball players from Illinois
Calgary Cannons players
Edmonton Trappers players
Falmouth Commodores players
Huntsville Stars players
Leones del Caracas players
American expatriate baseball players in Venezuela
Madison Muskies players
Major League Baseball pitchers
Modesto A's players
Oakland Athletics players
Sportspeople from La Grange, Illinois
Somerset Patriots players
Tacoma Tigers players
TCU Horned Frogs baseball players
Texarkana Bulldogs baseball players